Andy Cowie (11 March 1913 – 19 January 1972) was a professional footballer who played for Dundee, Aberdeen and Swindon Town. Cowie retired from football in 1951 and died in 1972.

References

1913 births
1972 deaths
Footballers from Motherwell
Scottish footballers
Scottish Football League players
English Football League players
Dundee F.C. players
Aberdeen F.C. players
Swindon Town F.C. players
Association football wing halves
Scottish Football League representative players